La Bicyclette is an album of the French singer Yves Montand, released in 1968.

External links
 La Bicyclette - Yves Montand on iTunes

1968 albums
French-language albums